In phonology and linguistics, a phoneme is a unit of sound that can distinguish one word from another in a particular language.

Two words like this that differ in meaning through the contrast of a single phoneme form a minimal pair.

Phonemes that are established by the use of minimal pairs, such as tap vs tab or pat vs bat, are written between slashes: , . To show pronunciation, linguists use square brackets:  (indicating an aspirated p in pat).

There are differing views as to exactly what phonemes are and how a given language should be analyzed in phonemic (or phonematic) terms. However, a phoneme is generally regarded as an abstraction of a set (or equivalence class) of speech sounds (phones) that are perceived as equivalent to each other in a given language. For example, the English k sounds in the words kill and skill are not identical (as described below), but they are distributional variants of a single phoneme . Speech sounds that differ but do not create a meaningful change in the word are known as allophones of the same phoneme. Allophonic variation may be conditioned, in which case a certain phoneme is realized as a certain allophone in particular phonological environments, or it may otherwise be free, and may vary by speaker or by dialect. Therefore, phonemes are often considered to constitute an abstract underlying representation for segments of words, while speech sounds make up the corresponding phonetic realization, or the surface form.

Notation
Phonemes are conventionally placed between slashes in transcription, whereas speech sounds (phones) are placed between square brackets. Thus,  represents a sequence of three phonemes,  (the word push in Standard English), and  represents the phonetic sequence of sounds  (aspirated p),  (the usual pronunciation of push). This should not be confused with the similar convention of the use of angle brackets to enclose the units of orthography, graphemes. For example, ⟨f⟩ represents the written letter (grapheme) f.

The symbols used for particular phonemes are often taken from the International Phonetic Alphabet (IPA), the same set of symbols most commonly used for phones. (For computer-typing purposes, systems such as X-SAMPA exist to represent IPA symbols using only ASCII characters.) However, descriptions of particular languages may use different conventional symbols to represent the phonemes of those languages.

Assignment of speech sounds to phonemes

A phoneme is a sound or a group of different sounds perceived to have the same function by speakers of the language or dialect in question. An example is the English phoneme , which occurs in words such as cat, kit, scat, skit. These different sounds are nonetheless considered to belong to the same phoneme, because if a speaker used one instead of the other, the meaning of the word would not change: using the aspirated form  in skill might sound odd, but the word would still be recognized. By contrast, some other sounds would cause a change in meaning if substituted: for example, substitution of the sound  would produce the different word still, and that sound must therefore be considered to represent a different phoneme (the phoneme ).

In those languages, therefore, the two sounds represent different phonemes.

Minimal pairs
The existence of minimal pairs is a common test to decide whether two phones represent different phonemes or are allophones of the same phoneme.

Signed languages, such as American Sign Language (ASL), also have minimal pairs, differing only in (exactly) one of the signs' parameters: handshape, movement, location, palm orientation, and nonmanual signal or marker. A minimal pair may exist in the signed language if the basic sign stays the same, but one of the parameters changes.

However, the absence of minimal pairs for a given pair of phones does not always mean that they belong to the same phoneme: they may be so dissimilar phonetically that it is unlikely for speakers to perceive them as the same sound. However, they are so dissimilar phonetically that they are considered separate phonemes.

Phonologists have sometimes had recourse to "near minimal pairs" to show that speakers of the language perceive two sounds as significantly different even if no exact minimal pair exists in the lexicon. The two words 'pressure'  and 'pleasure'  can serve as a near minimal pair.

Suprasegmental phonemes
Besides segmental phonemes such as vowels and consonants, there are also suprasegmental features of pronunciation (such as tone and stress, syllable boundaries and other forms of juncture, nasalization and vowel harmony), which, in many languages, change the meaning of words and so are phonemic.

Phonemic stress is encountered in languages such as English. For example, there are two words spelled invite, one is a verb and is stressed on the second syllable, the other is a noun and stressed on the first syllable (without changing any of the individual sounds). The position of the stress distinguishes the words and so a full phonemic specification would include indication of the position of the stress:  for the verb,  for the noun. In other languages, such as French, word stress cannot have this function (its position is generally predictable) and so it is not phonemic (and therefore not usually indicated in dictionaries).

Phonemic tones are found in languages such as Mandarin Chinese in which a given syllable can have five different tonal pronunciations:

The tone "phonemes" in such languages are sometimes called tonemes. Languages such as English do not have phonemic tone, but they use intonation for functions such as emphasis and attitude.

Distribution of allophones
When a phoneme has more than one allophone, the one actually heard at a given occurrence of that phoneme may be dependent on the phonetic environment (surrounding sounds). Allophones that normally cannot appear in the same environment are said to be in complementary distribution. In other cases, the choice of allophone may be dependent on the individual speaker or other unpredictable factors. Such allophones are said to be in free variation, but allophones are still selected in a specific phonetic context, not the other way around.

Background and related ideas
The term phoneme as an abstraction was developed by the Polish linguist Jan Baudouin de Courtenay and his student Mikołaj Kruszewski during 1875–1895. The term used by these two was fonema, the basic unit of what they called psychophonetics. Daniel Jones became the first linguist in the western world to use the term phoneme in its current sense, employing the word in his article "The phonetic structure of the Sechuana Language". The concept of the phoneme was then elaborated in the works of Nikolai Trubetzkoy and others of the Prague School (during the years 1926–1935), and in those of structuralists like Ferdinand de Saussure, Edward Sapir, and Leonard Bloomfield. Some structuralists (though not Sapir) rejected the idea of a cognitive or psycholinguistic function for the phoneme.

Later, it was used and redefined in generative linguistics, most famously by Noam Chomsky and Morris Halle, and remains central to many accounts of the development of modern phonology. As a theoretical concept or model, though, it has been supplemented and even replaced by others.

Some linguists (such as Roman Jakobson and Morris Halle) proposed that phonemes may be further decomposable into features, such features being the true minimal constituents of language. Features overlap each other in time, as do suprasegmental phonemes in oral language and many phonemes in sign languages. Features could be characterized in different ways: Jakobson and colleagues defined them in acoustic terms, Chomsky and Halle used a predominantly articulatory basis, though retaining some acoustic features, while Ladefoged's system is a purely articulatory system apart from the use of the acoustic term 'sibilant'.

In the description of some languages, the term chroneme has been used to indicate contrastive length or duration of phonemes. In languages in which tones are phonemic, the tone phonemes may be called tonemes. Though not all scholars working on such languages use these terms, they are by no means obsolete.

By analogy with the phoneme, linguists have proposed other sorts of underlying objects, giving them names with the suffix -eme, such as morpheme and grapheme. These are sometimes called emic units. The latter term was first used by Kenneth Pike, who also generalized the concepts of emic and etic description (from phonemic and phonetic respectively) to applications outside linguistics.

Restrictions on occurrence

Languages do not generally allow words or syllables to be built of any arbitrary sequences of phonemes. There are phonotactic restrictions on which sequences of phonemes are possible and in which environments certain phonemes can occur. Phonemes that are significantly limited by such restrictions may be called restricted phonemes.

In English, examples of such restrictions include the following:

 , as in sing, occurs only at the end of a syllable, never at the beginning (in many other languages, such as Māori, Swahili, Tagalog, and Thai,  can appear word-initially).
  occurs only at the beginning of a syllable, never at the end (a few languages, such as Arabic and Romanian, allow  syllable-finally).
 In non-rhotic dialects,  can occur immediately only before a vowel, never before a consonant.
  and  occur only before a vowel, never at the end of a syllable (except in interpretations in which a word like boy is analyzed as ).

Some phonotactic restrictions can alternatively be analyzed as cases of neutralization. See Neutralization and archiphonemes below, particularly the example of the occurrence of the three English nasals before stops.

Biuniqueness
Biuniqueness is a requirement of classic structuralist phonemics. It means that a given phone, wherever it occurs, must unambiguously be assigned to one and only one phoneme. In other words, the mapping between phones and phonemes is required to be many-to-one rather than many-to-many. The notion of biuniqueness was controversial among some pre-generative linguists and was prominently challenged by Morris Halle and Noam Chomsky in the late 1950s and early 1960s.

An example of the problems arising from the biuniqueness requirement is provided by the phenomenon of flapping in North American English. This appears to contradict biuniqueness.

For further discussion of such cases, see the next section.

Neutralization and archiphonemes

Phonemes that are contrastive in certain environments may not be contrastive in all environments. In the environments where they do not contrast, the contrast is said to be neutralized. In these positions it may become less clear which phoneme a given phone represents. Absolute neutralization is a phenomenon in which a segment of the underlying representation is not realized in any of its phonetic representations (surface forms). The term was introduced by Paul Kiparsky (1968), and contrasts with contextual neutralization where some phonemes are not contrastive in certain environments. Some phonologists prefer not to specify a unique phoneme in such cases, since to do so would mean providing redundant or even arbitrary information – instead they use the technique of underspecification. An archiphoneme is an object sometimes used to represent an underspecified phoneme.

These phonemes are contrasting in stressed syllables, but in unstressed syllables the contrast is lost, since both are reduced to the same sound, usually  (for details, see vowel reduction in Russian). In some cases even this may not provide an unambiguous answer. A description using the approach of underspecification would not attempt to assign  to a specific phoneme in some or all of these cases, although it might be assigned to an archiphoneme, written something like , which reflects the two neutralized phonemes in this position, or }, reflecting its unmerged values.

A somewhat different example is found in English, with the three nasal phonemes . In word-final position these all contrast, as shown by the minimal triplet sum , sun , sung . The nasals are therefore not contrastive in these environments, and according to some theorists this makes it inappropriate to assign the nasal phones heard here to any one of the phonemes (even though, in this case, the phonetic evidence is unambiguous). Instead they may analyze these phones as belonging to a single archiphoneme, written something like , and state the underlying representations of limp, lint, link to be .

This latter type of analysis is often associated with Nikolai Trubetzkoy of the Prague school. Archiphonemes are often notated with a capital letter within double virgules or pipes, as with the examples  and  given above.

Here the words betting and bedding might both be pronounced . Under the generative grammar theory of linguistics, if a speaker applies such flapping consistently, morphological evidence (the pronunciation of the related forms bet and bed, for example) would reveal which phoneme the flap represents, once it is known which morpheme is being used. However, other theorists would prefer not to make such a determination, and simply assign the flap in both cases to a single archiphoneme, written (for example) .

Morphophonemes

A morphophoneme is a theoretical unit at a deeper level of abstraction than traditional phonemes, and is taken to be a unit from which morphemes are built up. A morphophoneme within a morpheme can be expressed in different ways in different allomorphs of that morpheme (according to morphophonological rules).

Numbers of phonemes in different languages
All known languages use only a small subset of the many possible sounds that the human speech organs can produce, and, because of allophony, the number of distinct phonemes will generally be smaller than the number of identifiably different sounds. Different languages vary considerably in the number of phonemes they have in their systems (although apparent variation may sometimes result from the different approaches taken by the linguists doing the analysis). The total phonemic inventory in languages varies from as few as 9–11 in Pirahã and 11 in Rotokas to as many as 141 in !Xũ.

The number of phonemically distinct vowels can be as low as two, as in Ubykh and Arrernte. At the other extreme, the Bantu language Ngwe has 14 vowel qualities, 12 of which may occur long or short, making 26 oral vowels, plus six nasalized vowels, long and short, making a total of 38 vowels; while !Xóõ achieves 31 pure vowels, not counting its additional variation by vowel length, by varying the phonation. As regards consonant phonemes, Puinave and the Papuan language Tauade each have just seven, and Rotokas has only six. !Xóõ, on the other hand, has somewhere around 77, and Ubykh 81. The English language uses a rather large set of 13 to 21 vowel phonemes, including diphthongs, although its 22 to 26 consonants are close to average. Across all languages, the average number of consonant phonemes per language is about 22, while the average number of vowel phonemes is about 8.

Some languages, such as French, have no phonemic tone or stress, while Cantonese and several of the Kam–Sui languages have six to nine tones (depending on how they're counted), and the Kam-Sui Dong language has nine to 15 tones by the same measure. One of the Kru languages, Wobé, has been claimed to have 14, though this is disputed.

The most common vowel system consists of the five vowels .

The non-uniqueness of phonemic solutions
During the development of phoneme theory in the mid-20th century phonologists were concerned not only with the procedures and principles involved in producing a phonemic analysis of the sounds of a given language, but also with the reality or uniqueness of the phonemic solution. These were central concerns of phonology. Some writers took the position expressed by Kenneth Pike: "There is only one accurate phonemic analysis for a given set of data", while others believed that different analyses, equally valid, could be made for the same data.  Yuen Ren Chao (1934), in his article "The non-uniqueness of phonemic solutions of phonetic systems" stated "given the sounds of a language, there are usually more than one possible way of reducing them to a set of phonemes, and these different systems or solutions are not simply correct or incorrect, but may be regarded only as being good or bad for various purposes". The linguist F. W. Householder referred to this argument within linguistics as "God's Truth" (i.e. the stance that a given language has an intrinsic structure to be discovered) vs. "hocus-pocus" (i.e. the stance that any proposed, coherent structure is as good as any other).

Different analyses of the English vowel system may be used to illustrate this. The article English phonology states that "English has a particularly large number of vowel phonemes" and that "there are 20 vowel phonemes in Received Pronunciation, 14–16 in General American and 20–21 in Australian English". It is also possible to treat English long vowels and diphthongs as combinations of two vowel phonemes, with long vowels treated as a sequence of two short vowels, so that 'palm' would be represented as /paam/.

In the same period there was disagreement about the correct basis for a phonemic analysis. The structuralist position was that the analysis should be made purely on the basis of the sound elements and their distribution, with no reference to extraneous factors such as grammar, morphology or the intuitions of the native speaker; this position is strongly associated with Leonard Bloomfield. Zellig Harris claimed that it is possible to discover the phonemes of a language purely by examining the distribution of phonetic segments. Referring to mentalistic definitions of the phoneme, Twaddell (1935) stated "Such a definition is invalid because (1) we have no right to guess about the linguistic workings of an inaccessible 'mind', and (2) we can secure no advantage from such guesses. The linguistic processes of the 'mind' as such are quite simply unobservable; and introspection about linguistic processes is notoriously a fire in a wooden stove." This approach was opposed to that of Edward Sapir, who gave an important role to native speakers' intuitions about where a particular sound or group of sounds fitted into a pattern. Using English  as an example, Sapir argued that, despite the superficial appearance that this sound belongs to a group of three nasal consonant phonemes (/m/, /n/ and /ŋ/), native speakers feel that the velar nasal is really the sequence [ŋɡ]/. The theory of generative phonology which emerged in the 1960s explicitly rejected the Structuralist approach to phonology and favoured the mentalistic or cognitive view of Sapir.

These topics are discussed further in English phonology#Controversial issues.

Correspondence between letters and phonemes

Phonemes are considered to be the basis for alphabetic writing systems. In such systems the written symbols (graphemes) represent, in principle, the phonemes of the language being written. This is most obviously the case when the alphabet was invented with a particular language in mind; for example, the Latin alphabet was devised for Classical Latin, and therefore the Latin of that period enjoyed a near one-to-one correspondence between phonemes and graphemes in most cases, though the devisers of the alphabet chose not to represent the phonemic effect of vowel length. However, because changes in the spoken language are often not accompanied by changes in the established orthography (as well as other reasons, including dialect differences, the effects of morphophonology on orthography, and the use of foreign spellings for some loanwords), the correspondence between spelling and pronunciation in a given language may be highly distorted; this is the case with English, for example.

The correspondence between symbols and phonemes in alphabetic writing systems is not necessarily a one-to-one correspondence.

In sign languages
Sign language phonemes are bundles of articulation features. Stokoe was the first scholar to describe the phonemic system of ASL. He identified the bundles tab (elements of location, from Latin tabula), dez (the handshape, from designator), sig (the motion, from signation). Some researchers also discern ori (orientation), facial expression or mouthing. Just as with spoken languages, when features are combined, they create phonemes. As in spoken languages, sign languages have minimal pairs which differ in only one phoneme. For instance, the ASL signs for father and mother differ minimally with respect to location while handshape and movement are identical; location is thus contrastive.

Stokoe's terminology and notation system are no longer used by researchers to describe the phonemes of sign languages; William Stokoe's research, while still considered seminal, has been found not to characterize American Sign Language or other sign languages sufficiently. For instance, non-manual features are not included in Stokoe's classification. More sophisticated models of sign language phonology have since been proposed by Brentari, Sandler, and Van der Kooij.

Chereme

Cherology and chereme (from  "hand") are synonyms of phonology and phoneme previously used in the study of sign languages. A chereme, as the basic unit of signed communication, is functionally and psychologically equivalent to the phonemes of oral languages, and has been replaced by that term in the academic literature. Cherology, as the study of cheremes in language, is thus equivalent to phonology. The terms are not in use anymore. Instead, the terms phonology and phoneme (or distinctive feature) are used to stress the linguistic similarities between signed and spoken languages.

The terms were coined in 1960 by William Stokoe at Gallaudet University to describe sign languages as true and full languages.  Once a controversial idea, the position is now universally accepted in linguistics. Stokoe's terminology, however, has been largely abandoned.

See also

 Alphabetic principle
 Alternation (linguistics)
 Complementary distribution
 Diaphoneme
 Diphone
 Emic and etic
 Free variation
 Initial-stress-derived noun
 International Phonetic Alphabet
 Minimal pair
 Morphophonology
 Phone
 Phonemic orthography
 Phonology
 Phonological change
 Phonotactics
 Sphoṭa
 Toneme
 Triphone
 Viseme

Notes

References

Further reading

 (reprinted in Joos, M. Readings in Linguistics, 1957)

Learning to read
Reading (process)
Orthography
Phonetics
Phonology
Linguistics terminology